Craig Snow is an American politician. He serves as a Republican member for the 18th district of the Indiana House of Representatives.

Snow attended Warsaw Community High School and Grace College & Seminary, where he earned a Bachelor of Science in business administration. In 2020, Snow was elected for the 18th district of the Indiana House of Representatives. He succeeded David Wolkins. Snow assumed his office on November 4, 2020.

References 

Living people
Place of birth missing (living people)
Year of birth missing (living people)
Republican Party members of the Indiana House of Representatives
21st-century American politicians
Grace College alumni